Jayla Pina (born 23 July 2004) is a Cape Verdean swimmer. She competed in the women's 100 metre breaststroke at the 2020 Summer Olympics. Pina was born in the United States but is able to represent Cape Verde through her mother, who was born there. Her brother is fellow Olympic swimmer, Troy Pina and her sister is swimmer Latroya Pina.

References

External links
 

2004 births
Living people
Cape Verdean female swimmers
Olympic swimmers of Cape Verde
Swimmers at the 2020 Summer Olympics
Place of birth missing (living people)
American people of Cape Verdean descent